This is a list of companies listed on the National Stock Exchange of India (NSE).

!–9

A

B

C

D

E

F

G

H

I

J

K

L

M

N

O

P

Q

R

S

T

U

V

W

X

Y

Z

Companies with good fundamental 

NIFTY 50

References 

 
India NSE
Lists of companies of India
Economy of India lists